George Kurian is an Indian-American business executive. He is the current chief executive officer and a member of the board of NetApp. Prior to this, he was the Executive Vice President of Product Operations at NetApp.

Early life and education 
Kurian was born in Kerala, India. He is the twin brother of Google Cloud CEO, Thomas Kurian. George Kurian was a 1995 graduate of Stanford Graduate School of Business. He also holds an electrical engineering degree from Princeton University.

Career 
Kurian worked as a valet, pizza chef and bartender in college.

His career in tech included the role of vice president at Akamai Technologies, management consulting at McKinsey & Company, and leading Software Engineering and Product Management teams at Oracle Corporation.

NetApp Inc. 
Kurian joined NetApp in 2011 as Senior Vice President of its storage solutions group. He was promoted to EVP for product operations in 2013. He was promoted to Chief Executive Officer in 2015.

Kurian received a base salary of $9,491,210 as chief executive officer and director at NetApp.

Personal life 
Kurian is married and is a father of two. He resides in the San Francisco Bay Area.

References

Living people
Businesspeople from Kerala
Stanford Graduate School of Business alumni
Year of birth missing (living people)